The 24th Canadian Film Awards were held on October 3, 1972 to honour achievements in Canadian film. The ceremony was hosted by Jacques Fauteux.

Winners

Films
Film of the Year: Not awarded
Feature Film: Wedding in White — Dermet Productions, John Vidette producer, William Fruet director
Documentary: Selling Out — Unit Productions, Tadeusz Jaworski director and producer
Theatrical Short: This Is a Photograph — National Film Board of Canada, Tom Daly producer, Albert Kish director
Animated: Dans la vie... — National Film Board of Canada, René Jodoin producer, Pierre Veilleux director 
TV Drama: Françoise Durocher, Waitress — National Film Board of Canada, Pierre Duceppe and Jean-Marc Garand producers, André Brassard director
TV Information: Je chante à cheval avec Willie Lamothe — National Film Board of Canada - Paul Larose producer, Jacques Leduc and Lucien Ménard directors 
Nature and Wildlife: Dan Gibson's Nature Family — Dan Gibson Productions, Dan Gibson producer and director
Travel and Recreation: Images de la Gaspésie — Office du film du Québec, Jacques Parent producer, Jean-Claude Labrecque director, and
 Les Jeux du Quebec 1971 — Office du film du Québec, Jean Robitaille and Pierre Desmarchais directors
Public Relations: In Flight — Foster Advertising, Peter Gerretsen director
Sales Promotion: A Powerful Ally — Hydro Quebec, Bornemisza director
Training and Instruction: Child Behaviour Equals You — Crawley Films, F.R. Crawley producer, Peter Cock director

Feature Film Craft Awards
Performance by a Lead Actor: Gordon Pinsent, The Rowdyman — Crawley Films 
Performance by a Lead Actress: Micheline Lanctôt, The True Nature of Bernadette (La vraie nature de Bernadette) — Carle-Lamy Ltée.
Supporting Actor: Donald Pilon, The True Nature of Bernadette (La vraie nature de Bernadette) — Carle-Lamy Ltée.
Supporting Actress: Doris Petrie, Wedding in White — Dermet Productions
Art Direction: Karen Bromley, Wedding in White — Dermet Productions
Cinematography: Michel Brault, The Time of the Hunt (Le Temps d'une chasse) — NFB
Direction: Gilles Carle, The True Nature of Bernadette (La vraie nature de Bernadette) — Carle-Lamy Ltée.
Film Editing: Danielle Gagné, Dream Life (La Vie rêvée) — ACPAV
Sound Editing: Honor Griffith and John Kelly, Journey — Quest Film Productions
Music Score: Pierre F. Brault, The True Nature of Bernadette (La vraie nature de Bernadette) — Carle-Lamy Ltée.
Original Screenplay: Gilles Carle, The True Nature of Bernadette (La vraie nature de Bernadette) — Carle-Lamy Ltée.
Overall Sound: Claude Hazanavicius (re-recording) - The Time of the Hunt (Le Temps d'une chasse) — NFB, and 
 Paul Coombe and Ian Jacobson (re-recording) - Face-Off — Agincourt International

Non-Feature Craft Awards
Performance by a Lead Actor: Sean Sullivan, Springhill — CBC
Performance by a Lead Actress: Patricia Collins, The Golden Handshake — CBC
Art Direction: Harold Maxfield, Springhill — CBC
Cinematography: Georges Dufaux, À cris perdus — NFB
Direction: André Brassard,- Françoise Durocher, Waitress — NFB
Film Editing: James N. Williams, Prologue to Power
Sound Editing: Les Halman, Wet Earth and Warm People — NFB
Music Score: Larry Crosley, Journey to Power — Crawley Films
Screenplay: Michel Tremblay, Françoise Durocher, Waitress — NFB
Non-Dramatic Script: Chester Ronning, A Journey Forward: Chester Ronning in China
Sound Recording: Claude Delorme, Wet Earth and Warm People — NFB
Sound Re-Recording: Michel Descombes, This Is a Photograph — NFB

Special awards
Francis Mankiewicz - The Time of the Hunt (Le Temps d'une chasse)
Office du film du Québec - Un petit canard pas comme les autres
Wendy Michener Award: Mireille Dansereau - "for outstanding artistic achievement in Dream Life (La Vie rêvée) 
Grierson Award: Colin Low - "for outstanding contributions to Canadian cinema".

References

Canadian
Canadian Film Awards (1949–1978)
1972 in Toronto